Henry W. Eastham was a Massachusetts businessman and politician who served as a member and President of the Common Council, and as the 30th Mayor of Lynn, Massachusetts.

Shoe machinery business
Eastham was engaged in the manufacture of shoe manufacturing equipment, supplying the numerous shoe manufacturing companies that existed in Lynn at the time. In December 1904 Eastham sold his shoe knives and machinery business to the United Shoe Machinery Company.  Eastham later purchased the C.W. Dodge & Co. and operated it as the Eastham Shoe Machinery and Supply Company.

President of the Lynn Board of Aldermen
On December 30, 1901, Eastham was chosen as President of the Lynn Board of  Aldermen for 1902.

Notes

Mayors of Lynn, Massachusetts
Massachusetts city council members
American manufacturing businesspeople
People from Lynn, Massachusetts